Benoît Pellistrandi (born 1966) is a French historian and hispanist.

Biography 
Born in 1966 in Paris. A student at the École normale supérieure, he earned a PhD in history. He served as Director of Studies of the Casa de Velázquez from 1997 to 2005. He was worked as lecturer at the Institut Catholique de Paris (ICP) and as teacher for classes préparatoires at the Lycée Condorcet.

He has been a corresponding member of the Royal Academy of History since 2013.

Works 

Author
 
 
 

Editor/Coordinator

References  

French Hispanists
20th-century French historians
1966 births
École Normale Supérieure alumni
Corresponding members of the Real Academia de la Historia
Living people
21st-century French historians